Shōko Inoue (井上昌己, Inoue Shōko, born Yawatahama, Ehime, 21 July 1969) is a Japanese singer best known outside Japan for her songs for Saint Tail in 1995 and 1996.

Albums
Ai no Kamisama, koi no Tenshi 愛の神様 恋の天使 (1993)
Sweet (1994 mini-album)
Bitter (1994 mini-album)
Fair Way (1994) 
Fair Way Live (1995 live)
Bitter II (1995 mini-album)
Sweet II (1995 mini-album)
Up Side Down (1996) 
Retsu Ai 熱愛 (1998) 
Bana Orange Berry バナ・オレンジ・ベリー (2002) 
Shokoland 2nd  (2003 )
Brand-New Feel (2008) 
Precious Moment (2009)

References

External links
 このアーティストをご存知ですか？「井上昌己」　[アーティスト]

1969 births
Living people
Japanese women singers
Musicians from Ehime Prefecture
People from Yawatahama, Ehime